Huttoft is a village in the East Lindsey district of Lincolnshire, England, about  east of the market town of Alford, on the A52 road between Ingoldmells and Sutton-on-Sea. John Betjeman, later England's Poet Laureate, visited Huttoft in the 1940s and devoted a poem to its parish church.

Etymology and early history
Huttoft is listed three times in the 1086 Domesday Book as Hotoft, in the manors of both Huttoft and Greetham in the Calcewath Hundred of the South Riding of Lindsey. Before the Norman Conquest Earl Harold was lord of Greetham; this in 1086 transferred to Earl Hugh of Chester who also became tenant-in-chief to King William I. The 1086 tenant-in-chief of Huttoft was Alfred of Lincoln.

Huttoft is an Anglo-Norse place-name derived from Old English hoh "decline", "slope" and Old Norse topt "site of a house". However, the Dictionary of British Place Names defines Huttoft as a "homestead on a spur of land." De Beaurepaire states that it is the same name as the Hottot; Hotot (f. e. Hotot-en-Auge) ; Hautot (former Hotot. f. e. Hautot-sur-Seine) in Normandy.

Landmarks
St Margaret's Church is built of stone in the decorated style, and is a Grade I listed building. Built of greenstone, limestone, and with some brick patching, Restorations took place in 1869, 1882, and 1910. The west tower is 13th-century, although it was extended in the 14th century. The font is 15th-century, although the cover is 19th-century. The churchyard cross, is a Grade II listed structure, which was restored in 1896 with the addition of a crucifix.

The Poet Laureate John Betjeman (1906–1984) was fond of Lincolnshire: Wolds, Marsh and the Georgian town of Louth. He refers to St Margaret's, Huttoft, in the second of his Lincolnshire poems, A Lincolnshire Church. This is one of his longer poems and also mentions the vicar of 1943–1959, Theophilus Caleb, whom he met.

The Wesleyan Methodist chapel in Sutton Road, Huttoft, joined the Alford, Skegness and Wainfleet Methodist Circuit in 1997.

The Primitive Methodists also had a chapel, in Church Lane, which was on the Alford Methodist circuit until 1963 and has since been demolished, but its graveyard remains.

Huttoft windmill, in the centre of the village, is a Grade II listed building. It lost its sails in 1945 in a storm after a century of milling.

Huttoft School was built as a National School in 1840 and enlarged in 1874. It was known as Huttoft CE School by 1914, and became Huttoft County Primary in 1947. It became a grant-maintained school and has been known as Huttoft Primary (GM) School since 1999.

It provided clay for repairs to the sea bank after the North Sea flood of 1953. It includes a large open water area and extensive reed beds. Huttoft Bank leads to Huttoft Beach, also known as Moggs Eye.

Huttoft is the location of the Radcliffe Donkey Sanctuary.

Gallery

Population

References

External links

Website of the Radcliffe Donkey Sanctuary

Villages in Lincolnshire
Civil parishes in Lincolnshire
East Lindsey District